Carlos Viveros (born January 22, 1993) is an American soccer player.

Career 
Viveros, a Katy native, starred at Eastern New Mexico University for four years and entered the Dynamo’s developmental pipeline through the annual Dynamo Trials and played for Brazos Valley Cavalry in the Premier Development League.

References

External links
 

1993 births
Living people
American soccer players
Association football forwards
Brazos Valley Cavalry FC players
Rio Grande Valley FC Toros players
Soccer players from Texas
USL League Two players
USL Championship players